Mary Sutherland may refer to:
 Mary S. Sutherland, American academic and educator; professor of health education at Florida State University
 Mary Ann Sutherland (1864–1948), New Zealand farmer and landowner
 Mary Sutherland (forester) (1893–1955), first professional woman employed by the New Zealand State Forest Service
 Mary Sutherland (political administrator) (1895–1972), Chief Women's Officer of the British Labour Party

See also
Liz Carpenter (1920-2010), born Mary Elizabeth Sutherland, writer, feminist and reporter